"Yoru no Hate" ( 夜の果て, End of the Night), is the first major single by the Japanese band Nico Touches the Walls from their debut album Who Are You?. The single is a very great introduction for the rock quartet. It's a loud and emotional song mixed exceptionally well with prevailing guitar and all.
 
"Yoru no Hate" comes with two more tracks: "Bunny Girl to Danny Boy" (another song from the album "Who Are You?") and "April" a slow love song that works as a great cooldown after listening to the title track.

Chart position
"Yoru no Hate" peaked at number 64 on the Oricon Chart in Japan.

Track listing
"Yoru no Hate"
"Bunny Girl to Danny boy"
"April"

References

External links
 Nico Touches the Walls official website

2008 singles
Nico Touches the Walls songs
2008 songs
Ki/oon Music singles

ja:夜の果て